Hugo Nys and Jan Zieliński were the defending champions but chose not to defend their title.

Franco Agamenone and Manuel Guinard won the title after defeating Ivan and Matej Sabanov 7–6(7–2), 7–6(7–3) in the final.

Seeds

Draw

References

External links
 Main draw

Challenger di Roseto degli Abruzzi II - Doubles